Ubá is a municipality located in the Zona da Mata mesoregion of Minas Gerais, Brazil,  southeast of Belo Horizonte, and  north of Rio de Janeiro. The estimated population of the city of Ubá was 116,797 in 2020. The current mayor of Ubá is Edson Teixeira Filho.

Once a great tobacco producer, Ubá has one of the main furniture industry parks in Brazil. The city is the economic and cultural center of Ubá microregion. It is also home of the famous Ubá mango (Manga Ubá).

History

Settlement
The Pomba River basin settlement took place, initially, due to the decline of mining activities. In the late 18th and early 19th century, several families left Mariana, Ouro Preto, and other mining centers in search of fertile land where they could undertake activities that would result in a more stable and secure incoming. The regions bathed by the Itajaí River, Chopotó River, Pomba River, among others, were of great interest because the land in those areas were of great fertility, and that they were previously inhabited only by natives (Coroados, Coropós and Purís) and adventurers.

The attempts of colonization of Coroados, Coropós, Purís and Botocudos always ended in bloody battles between the true owners of the land and the white invaders. During the battles, using arrows and axes against firearms, the Indians were gradually slaughtered or made prisoners for slave labor, especially when it comes to young people and women.

Due to the international pressure against the genocide of natives, the King of Portugal was convinced to order the Governor Luís Diogo Lobo da Silva to organize an expedition in an attempt to friendly approach the natives. In November 1767, Father Manoel de Jesus Maria was put in charge for the conversion of the natives to Catholicism, laying the groundwork for the entry of the owners of land grants after 1797. Captain Francisco Pires de Farinho, who was familiar with the tracks of forests and the indigenous customs, and was familiar with them, was named special guide with control power.

Father Jesus Maria arrived at Uba River, where the Coroado natives lived. Those natives used a kind of grass, Gynerium sagittatum (in Portuguese, U-Uva), to make the arrows they used. For linguistic evolution U-Uva became Ubá. Between 1797 and 1798, the first land grants located around the river were donated.

In 1805, Captain Antonio Januário Carneiro and his brother-in-law Commander Jose de Faria Alvim Cesario, acquired several land grants previously belonging to the Municipality of São João Batista do Presídio, bringing their families, slaves and livestock. In this period, according to an agreement between the Vatican and the Catholic Monarchs, when a settlement in the colonies was founded, a church was to be the first building to be built. While the former owners of land were concerned about their farms, Antonio Januário Carneiro idealized establish a settlement. His first step was to lead a movement to sign the petition requesting the permit for the construction of the church. On November 3, 1815, the request was granted.

To promote this settlement, Captain Januário Carneiro brought all the workers needed to build the church by giving them small pieces of land, housing and food, while they could not have its own supply by cultivating the land. The chapel received the name of St. Januarius, and the village the name of Capela de São Januário de Ubá (Chapel of St. Januarius of Ubá).

Due to the growth of the village, it was elevated to Paróquia de São Januário de Ubá (Parish of St. Januarius of Ubá) on April 7, 1841. The development of the town took place gradually around the parish. Due to the development of the parish and the activities of the inhabitants, especially coffee plantations, the settlement was officially recognized as a village on June 17, 1853, and on July 3, 1857 was incorporated as a municipality.

The first city council was composed by:

Colonel Francisco de Assis Ataíde
Pedro de Souza Ozório
Maximiano José Pereira de Souza
Joaquim Vieira da Silva Pinto
Manoel de Oliveira da Silva Brandão
Diogo da Rocha Bastos

Geography
Ubá is situated in the Zona da Mata mesoregion of Minas Gerais. Most of the city lies in the Paraíba do Sul River basin, with a small part of it lying in the Doce River basin. The city is not surrounded by any large river. Ubá River crosses the city from northwest to southeast and is responsible for drainage of most sewers in the city.

The city sits in a valley and has only 5% of its area flat, the rest being rugged. The altitude ranges from 295 meters to 875 meters.

Climate
Ubá's climate can be classified as Tropical, with yearly average temperature between 18 and 31 °C (64 and 88 °F). The city is considered the warmest one in the Zona da Mata mesoregion, and the temperatures can reach over 40 °C (104 ºF) between November and February.

Notable current and former residents

Ary Barroso, composer and radio man
Antônio Olinto, writer
Ascânio Lopes, poet
Evandro Soldati, fashion model
Mauro Mendonça, actor
Nelson Ned, singer
Levindo Ozanam Coelho, politic, lawyer and prosecutor
Raul Soares de Moura, politic, jurist and professor

See also
 List of municipalities in Minas Gerais

References

Municipalities in Minas Gerais